The Kevin Whitaker Chevrolet 150 was a NASCAR K&N Pro Series East race held annually from 2006 to 2017 at Greenville-Pickens Speedway. It was a  race.

History
The speedway had two races held at the track from 2011-2014 and 2016.

Past winners

2008, 2010 and 2015: Race extended due to a green-white-checker finish.

References

External links
 

2006 establishments in South Carolina
2017 disestablishments in South Carolina
Recurring sporting events established in 2006
Recurring sporting events disestablished in 2017
Tourist attractions in Pickens County, South Carolina
Former NASCAR races